Abyek-e Sofla (also Romanized as Ābyek-e Soflā; also known as Ābyek-e Vasaţī, Ābyek-e Pā’īn, and Abiak Pāīn) is a village in Ziaran Rural District, in the Central District of Abyek County, Qazvin Province, Iran. At the 2006 census, its population was 129, in 41 families.

References 

Populated places in Abyek County